Pleasure Syndrome is the second studio album by the Australian alternative rock/post-punk band Witch Hats, released through Longtime Listener/BMG on 14 October 2011.

The album was produced by US-born producer/engineer Casey Rice (Dirty Three, Tortoise). Guitarist Tom Barry left the group shortly after the recording sessions of Pleasure Syndrome and was quickly replaced by Robert Wrigley.

A video clip for "Hear Martin" was released (view here) in August 2011, which was followed by a second clip for "In the Mortuary" in January 2012. In June 2012, Buscombe spoke to "The Brag'" about Pleasure Syndrome saying that while he is satisfied with the album as a piece of work, he is disappointed with its longevity and also revealed that they had problems with their record label, Longtime Listener who distributed it.

Track listing

References

2011 albums
Witch Hats albums